Henry Francis Dunne (21 February 1872 – 7 October 1959) was an Australian rules footballer who played with Carlton in the Victorian Football League (VFL).

Notes

External links 

	
Henry Dunne's profile at Blueseum

Australian rules footballers from Victoria (Australia)
Carlton Football Club (VFA) players
Carlton Football Club players
1872 births
1959 deaths